She Wanted a Millionaire is a 1932 American pre-Code film starring Joan Bennett and Spencer Tracy. The film, produced and distributed by Fox Film Corporation, was directed by John G. Blystone and also features Una Merkel. It is the only film that Bennett and Tracy made together in which she was billed over Tracy.  They also played the top-billed romantic leads in Me and My Gal (1932), Father of the Bride (1950), and Father's Little Dividend (1951).

Cast
Joan Bennett as Jane Miller
Spencer Tracy as William Kelley
Una Merkel as Mary Taylor		 	
James Kirkwood as Roger Norton
Dorothy Peterson as Mrs. Miller
Douglas Cosgrove as Mr. Miller 
Don Dillaway as Humphrey
Tetsu Komai as Charlie
 Constantine Romanoff as Monk
 George Chandler as Hotel Worker 
 Lucille La Verne as 	Mother Norton
 Judith Vosselli as French Society Woman
 Cecilia Parker as Miss Hollywood
 June Lang as Beauty Contest Contestant 
 Sheila Bromley as Beauty Contest Contestant
 Janet Chandler as 	Beauty Contest Contestant
 Peaches Jackson as Beauty Contest Contestant

References

Bibliography
 Solomon, Aubrey. The Fox Film Corporation, 1915-1935: A History and Filmography. McFarland, 2011.

External links
 She Wanted a Millionaire at Internet Movie Database
 

1932 films
Fox Film films
1932 romantic drama films
American romantic drama films
Films produced by William Fox
Films with screenplays by Dudley Nichols
Films directed by John G. Blystone
American black-and-white films
1930s American films
Silent romantic drama films